Ocean Eyes is the second album by American electronica project Owl City, released on July 28, 2009, by Universal Republic Records. It features a photograph of the Burj Al Arab as its album artwork. A vinyl edition was released, followed by a deluxe edition available on January 26, 2010. The deluxe edition incorporates four new tracks, including a remix of "Hello Seattle". The album contains guest vocals by Relient K vocalist Matt Thiessen on the songs "Fireflies", "Cave In", "The Bird and the Worm", and "Tidal Wave".

Background 
In the 2000s, the works of the Postal Service inspired a wave of emo-influenced synthpop acts such as PlayRadioPlay!, Hellogoodbye, and Owl City. Just before Ocean Eyess July 2009, Owl City garnered two hits on the Top Electronic Albums chart and over 40 million plays on MySpace.

On July 14, 2009, the song "Fireflies" was chosen as the Single of the Week by the iTunes Store. This led to a huge success as the song was downloaded over 650,000 times and helped the album reach No. 2 on the U.S. store. This success also led to the record company pushing back the release date of the physical copy of the album from July 28, 2009, to September 1, 2009. The album sold approximately 18,000 copies digitally in its debut week, and reached the top ten in the U.S., peaking at No. 8. That same week, its lead single, "Fireflies", topped the Billboard Hot 100. Eventually, Ocean Eyes climbed to No. 1 on the iTunes Store after the album price was lowered for a limited period of time. The album has sold 1.1 million copies in the US as of 2012.

The album contains slightly different versions of songs from previous albums, namely "Hello Seattle" from Of June and "On the Wing" and "The Saltwater Room" from Maybe I'm Dreaming.

Young revealed the origin of the album's title when he said:

Critical reception 

Ocean Eyes received mixed reviews from critics, based on an aggregate Metacritic score of 53/100, indicating "Mixed or average reviews". The album gained some positive reviews, including Entertainment Weekly which gave it a B+ and said that it was filled with memorable choruses and that the highlight song was "Dental Care". Jesus Freak Hideout also was favorable towards the album; the review highlighted the album's musical style, saying that it had "dreamy lyrics and open soundscapes."

On the other hand, Rolling Stone claimed Ocean Eyes as "disappointing", only awarding it 2/5 stars. The magazine especially criticized the slower songs, saying that forgettable tracks like "On the Wing" were "just mush". AllMusic also gave the album a total of 2.5/5, stating "Ocean Eyes ultimately winds up too sugary for its own good, though, having focused on dessert without giving its listeners any sort of meaty, substantive entrée. A handful of ballads add some sense of variety to the album's pace, but Owl City is largely a vehicle for the one song Adam Young knows how to make."

Singles 
"Fireflies" was released as the album's first single on July 14, 2009, in the U.S. and on January 8, 2010, in the U.K. It climbed the Billboard Hot 100 slowly until reaching No. 7 and leaping to No. 1 the following week. "Fireflies" topped the Billboard Chart for two non-consecutive weeks, as well as topping the iTunes Top 100 Chart for several weeks. "Fireflies" was originally released as a free U.S. iTunes digital download the week the album had its digital release in the U.S., which could have contributed to the single's massive success. "Fireflies" continued to make the top 10 most downloaded songs in many countries and reached No.1 on the Official U.K. Singles Chart on January 24, 2010.

"Vanilla Twilight" was released as the album's second US single on January 26, 2010, to radio, the same day that the deluxe edition of Ocean Eyes hit stores. During the same week that "Fireflies" topped the Hot 100, "Vanilla Twilight" debuted at No. 95. It has since re-entered and re-peaked on the Hot 100 at No. 72 on the week ending January 9, 2010.

"Umbrella Beach" was released as the album's second U.K. single on May 17, 2010. "Umbrella Beach" was originally released promotionally on November 19, 2009, preceding the release of the official first single "Fireflies." An exclusive remix created by Kenny Hayes is included on the single release. There is also a music video available for it. Unlike "Fireflies" and "Vanilla Twilight", Young does not appear in the video, aside from a few photos.

Digital singles 
"Strawberry Avalanche" and "Hot Air Balloon" were released as digital-only promotional singles on June 3, 2009, leading up to the release of the album, though they did not appear on the album.

"Sunburn" was released as a digital-only promotional single for the soundtrack of 90210 on October 13, 2009, and it was also released free to people who bought "Ocean Eyes" during a span of several weeks of December 2009.

Awards and nominations

Track listing

Personnel 
 Owl City
Adam Young – vocals, keyboards, synthesizers, piano, guitars, bass, drums, programming, producer, engineer
Additional musicians and production
Breanne Düren – additional vocals on tracks 5 and 8
Austin Tofte – additional vocals on track 8
 Matthew Thiessen – additional vocals on tracks on 1, 2, 9, 12 and 14, production on tracks 2, 9, 12
 Melisa Morgan – additional vocals on tracks 7 and 10
 Jolie Lindholm – additional vocals on track 7
 Phil Peterson – cello on tracks 1, 4, 8, 9 and 10
 Steve Bursky – producer, management
 Ted Jensen – mastering
 Christopher Kornmann – art direction
 Imran Khan – artwork
 John Goodmanson – audio mixer

Charts

Weekly charts

Year-end charts

Certifications

References

2009 albums
Owl City albums